Live at The Cafe Au Go Go is the debut album by the American band The Blues Project, recorded live during the Blues Bag four-day concert on the evenings of November 24–27, 1965 at the Cafe Au Go Go in New York City. The recording finished up in January, 1966 at the same venue, by which time Tommy Flanders had left the band. They scaled down their usual lengthy arrangements for the album due to time constraints and record label wariness.

Track listing

Side one
"Goin' Down Louisiana" (Muddy Waters) – 4:04
"You Go, I'll Go with You" (Willie Dixon) – 3:49
"Catch the Wind" (Donovan) – 3:05
"I Want to Be Your Driver" (Chuck Berry) – 2:23
"Alberta" (Traditional) – 4:10
"The Way My Baby Walks" (Andy Kulberg) – 3:09

Side two
"Violets of Dawn" (Eric Andersen) – 2:56
"Back Door Man" (Dixon) – 3:16
"Jelly Jelly Blues" (Billy Eckstine, Earl Hines) – 4:45
"Spoonful" (Dixon) – 4:58
"Who Do You Love?" (Ellas McDaniel) – 5:30

Personnel

Musicians
Tommy Flanders – vocals (tracks B1, B2, B4, B5)
Danny Kalb – lead guitar, vocals (tracks A1, A2, A5, A6)
Al Kooper – organ, vocals (track A4)
Steve Katz – rhythm guitar, vocals (track A3)
Andy Kulberg – bass
Roy Blumenfeld – drums

Technical
Jerry Schoenbaum – producer, liner notes
Val Valentin – engineer
Charles Stewart – cover photo

References

1966 live albums
Blues Project albums
1966 debut albums
Verve Records live albums